The Bern Riddles, also known as Aenigmata Bernensia, Aenigmata Hexasticha or  Riddles of Tullius, are a collection of 63 metrical Latin riddles, named after the location of their earliest surviving manuscript, which today is held in Bern (though probably produced in Bourges): the early eighth-century Codex Bernensis 611.

Origin
Although it has been suggested that they were composed in late antiquity, most scholars consider that the Bern Riddles were inspired by the c. fourth-century collection of riddles attributed to Symphosius, and date to around the seventh century.

The author of the Bern Riddles is not known but the book might have been written by "a Lombard familiar with Mediterranean flora and food"; perhaps in the monastery of Bobbio. According to Archer Taylor, "The Berne Riddles are especially interesting for the author's familiarity with the North Italian landscape and its plants. Whoever he was, we may safely call him the first medieval riddle-master in Italy". However, some scholars see the origin of the Bern Riddles in Anglo-Saxon England, where several early medieval collections of metrical riddles originated, such as the Enigmata of Aldhelm.

Subjects
The subjects of the Bern Riddles are as follows:

 1.  (bowl)
 2.  (lamp)
 3.  (salt)
 4.  (bench)
 5.  (table)
 6.  ((glass) chalice)
 7.  (air-bubble)
 8.  (egg)
 9.  (millstone)
 10.  (ladder)
 11.  (ship)
 12.  (grain of corn)
 13.  (grapevine)
 14.  (olive)
 15.  (palm-tree)
 16.  (cedar-berry)
 17.  (sieve)
 18.  (broom)
 19.  (wax tablet)
 20.  (honey)
 21.  (bee)
 22.  (sheep)
 23.  (fire-spark)
 24.  (parchment)
 25.  (letters)
 26.  (mustard)
 27.  ((papyrus)-paper)
 28.  (silkworm)
 29.  (mirror)
 30.  (fish)
 31.  (siphon)
 32.  (sponge)
 33.  (violet)
 34.  (rose)
 35.  (lilies)
 36.  (saffron)
 37.  (pepper)
 38.  (ice)
 39.  (ivy)
 40.  (mousetrap)
 41.  (wind)
 42.  (ice)
 43.  (silkworms)
 44.  (pearl)
 45.  (earth)
 46.  (pestle)
 47.  (snail-shell)
 48.  (chestnut)
 49.  (rain)
 50.  (wine)
 50a.  (wood-pulp paper)
 51.  (garlic)
 52.  (rose)
 53. de trutina (weighing-scales)
 54. de insubulo (weaving-loom)
 55.  (sun)
 56.  (sun)
 57.  (sun)
 58.  (moon)
 59.  (moon)
 60.  (sky)
 61.  (shadow)
 62.  (stars)
 63.  (wine)

Examples

The riddles are written in Latin rhythmic hexameter.

Manuscripts
The Bern Riddles come down to us in the following manuscripts:

Editions and translations

The best modern editions of the Bern Riddles are:

 'Aenigmata in Dei nomine Tullii seu aenigmata quaestionum artis rhetoricae [aenigmata "bernensia"]', ed. by Fr.
 Strecker, Karl (ed). “Aenigmata Hexasticha.” MGH: Poetae Latini aevi Carolingi, Vol. 4.2; Berlin, 1914. pp. 732-759.
 The Bern Riddles, in  The Riddle Ages: Old English Riddles, Translations and Commentaries, ed. by Megan Cavell and Neville Mogford, with Matthias Ammon and Victoria Symons (2013-). An edition and English translation of the Bern Riddles begun in 2020.

References

Further reading
 Neville Mogford, 'The Moon and Stars in the Bern and Eusebius Riddles', in Riddles at Work in the Early Medieval Tradition: Words, Ideas, Interactions, ed. by Megan Cavell and Jennifer Neville (Manchester: Manchester University Press, 2020), pp. 230–46 , .

Riddles
Medieval Latin texts